Fani is a small town and commune in the Cercle of Bla in the Ségou Region of southern-central Mali. In 1998 the commune had a population of 10,184.

References
2. http://odishabhaskar.com/?p=26899

Communes of Ségou Region